Carel Godfried Willem Hendrik (Pim), Baron van Boetzelaer van Oosterhout (17 November 1892, in Amersfoort – 20 May 1986, in Ubbergen) was a Dutch diplomat and politician.

Van Boetzelaer van Oosterhout's father was mayor of Leusden. After studying at Utrecht University and obtaining a Master of Laws at the University of Amsterdam in 1921, he held many diplomatic positions abroad including in Washington DC (1926–29), Mexico City (1929–30), Brussels (1930-1934), and Berlin (1934-1940). After the German invasion of the Netherlands he led the diplomatic affairs in London from May to August 1940 after which he became ambassador for the Netherlands in Washington DC.

He held this position until he was asked, as a non-partisan, to become Minister of Foreign Affairs in the first Beel cabinet (3 July 1946 to 7 August 1948). As minister he voted in August 1947 against expansion of military actions in the Dutch East Indies, pushed through laws enabling the Benelux treaties, signed the Organisation for European Economic Co-operation and the subsequent Marshall Plan contracts, and prepared the way for the NATO by signing the Treaty of Brussels in March 1948.

References
Mr. C.G.W.H. baron van Boetzelaer van Oosterhout at parlement.com (Dutch)

External links
 

1892 births
1986 deaths
Ministers of Foreign Affairs of the Netherlands
Ambassadors of the Netherlands to the United States
Dutch jurists
People from Leiden
Utrecht University alumni
University of Amsterdam alumni
Barons of the Netherlands
Independent politicians in the Netherlands